Operation Stackola is the debut album by hip hop duo Luniz, which was released on July 4, 1995. The album was eventually certified Platinum by the RIAA for sales of over one million records on June 20, 2000. It features the group's most famous song to date, "I Got 5 on It." The album is The Luniz's best selling album, and it topped the Top R&B/Hip Hop Albums chart for over 2 weeks and making the Top 20 on the Billboard 200.

Reception

Critical response
The Source (8/95, p. 79) - 3.5 mics—Dope—"The Luniz...take the typical Oakland sound to another level...a combination of insane lyrics and street-core knowledge....tight lyrics and tight tracks...a must to compete in this diverse rap game...."

Melody Maker (3/23/96, p. 38)—Recommended—"Luniz aren't gangstas but playas.... The lifestyle depicted on Operation Stackola involves claiming Welfare and carrying a bus pass so that you can still afford to smoke Indo and drink Tanqueray and wear the latest Phat Farm."

Main Promoter K9 1995 
Rap Pages (9/95, p. 26)—7 (out of 10)—"1995 is the year of Operation Stackola.... A balanced attack of Yukmouth's laid-back delivery and Knumskull's pinched vocal pitch...the Luniz do mental atomic pile drivers on ears and heads while ripping up microphones...."

Track listing
"Intro" – 0:51
"Put the Lead on Ya" (featuring Dru Down) – 5:25
"I Got 5 on It" (featuring Michael Marshall) – 4:13
"Broke Hos" – 4:11
"Pimps, Playas & Hustlas" (featuring Dru Down and Richie Rich) – 5:02
"Playa Hata" (featuring Teddy) – 4:31
"Broke Niggaz" (featuring Knucklehead and Eclipse) – 5:19
"Operation Stackola" – 4:36
"5150" (featuring Shock G) – 4:03
"900 Blame a Nigga" – 4:18
"Yellow Brick Road" – 5:35
"So Much Drama" (featuring Nik Nack) – 4:14
"She's Just a Freak" (featuring Knucklehead) – 4:12
"Plead Guilty" – 4:23
"I Got 5 on It (Reprise)" – 5:08
"Outro" – 0:33

Charts

Weekly charts

Year-end charts

Certifications

See also
List of number-one R&B albums of 1995 (U.S.)

References

1995 debut albums
Luniz albums
Virgin Records albums